"I Dream of Women Like You" is a song written by Troy Seals, and recorded by American country music artist Ronnie McDowell.  It was released in February 1984 as the second single from the album Country Boy's Heart.  The song reached #3 on the Billboard Hot Country Singles & Tracks chart.

Chart performance

References

1984 singles
Ronnie McDowell songs
Songs written by Troy Seals
Song recordings produced by Buddy Killen
Epic Records singles
1984 songs